Moreana is a biannual peer-reviewed academic journal covering research about Thomas More and his milieu and writings, as well as relevant broader questions of 16th-century history, literature and culture. It is  published by Edinburgh University Press on behalf of Amici Thomae Mori (English: Society of Friends of Thomas More), with Travis Curtright (Ave Maria University) as editor-in-chief.

History
The journal was established in 1963 under the auspices of Amici Thomae Mori, which had been founded in Brussels the previous year. The editor-in-chief for the first twenty-five years was Germain Marc'hadour (Université Catholique de l'Ouest). He was succeeded by Marie-Claire Phélippeau (Lycée Joffre).

Abstracting and indexing
The journal is abstracted and indexed in:
Annual Bibliography of English Language and Literature
EBSCO databases
Emerging Sources Citation Index
Modern Language Association Database
ProQuest databases
Religious and Theological Abstracts
Scopus

See also
Utopian Studies Society

References

External links

Amici Thomae Mori

Quarterly journals
Publications established in 1963
Multilingual journals
Christianity studies journals